Survivor 2, was the second edition of the Greek version of the popular reality show Survivor and it aired from September 2004 to December 2004. There were a few main twists this season, the first being that the tribes were initially divided by gender. However, this twist was short lived due to the evacuation of Helen and Maria's voluntary exit both which took place in week two of the shows airing. The other twist for this season was that of "Gkoal", when a contestant was voted out they would be given a chance to go to Gkoal where they would duel other contestants for a spot in the game. The winner of Gkoal was Manolis. Right before the merge, the contestants took part in a challenge which Giannis lost and was eliminated. When it came time for the final four, all remaining contestants were asked to vote for someone to return to the game from the eliminated contestants, Konstantina who had been voted out right after the elimination challenge that took place before the merge, received the most votes and returned to the game. When given the opportunity to vote for a winner only three jury members chose to vote as the others didn't feel either of the final two deserved to win the season. Ultimately, it was Konstantinos Christodoulopoulos won this season over Anna Majuro with a jury vote of 3-0.

Finishing order

External links
(Season 2 Official Site Archive) 

02
Television shows filmed in Malaysia